Eclipse Comics was an American comic book publisher, one of several independent publishers during the 1980s and early 1990s. In 1978, it published the first graphic novel intended for the newly created comic book specialty store market. It was one of the first to offer royalties and creator ownership of rights, and it was the first comics company to publish trading cards.

History
The company was founded as Eclipse Enterprises by brothers Jan and Dean Mullaney in 1977. Eclipse published one of the first original graphic novels, and the first to be sold through the new "direct market" of comic-book stores, Sabre: Slow Fade of an Endangered Species by Don McGregor and Paul Gulacy. Published in August 1978, it led to a 14-issue spin-off series for Eclipse.

McGregor went on to write two additional early graphic novels for Eclipse, each set in contemporary New York City and starring interracial-buddy private eyes Ted Denning and Bob Rainier: Detectives, Inc.: A Remembrance of Threatening Green (1980), with artist Marshall Rogers, and Detectives, Inc.: A Terror of Dying Dreams (1985), with artist Gene Colan, who would become a frequent collaborator.

The company had early success with the anthology magazine Eclipse and color comic Eclipse Monthly, as well as with the detective series Ms. Tree by Max Allan Collins.

Creators whose early work appears in Eclipse publications include Chuck Austen, Donna Barr, Dan Brereton, Chuck Dixon, James Hudnall, Scott McCloud, Peter Milligan, Tim Truman, and Chris Ware. Veterans published by Eclipse include Steve Englehart, Don McGregor, Gene Colan, and Mark Evanier. The company published Alan Moore's series Miracleman (stories originally published in the U.K.).

Locations 
During the early 1980s, Eclipse moved several times: from 81 Delaware Street, Staten Island, New York; to  295 Austin Street, Columbia, Missouri; and then to the small towns of Guerneville and later Forestville in Sonoma County, California.

Expansion 
Beginning in Missouri, Eclipse expanded operations under editor Cat Yronwode (who was married to Eclipse co-founder Dean Mullaney from 1987 to 1993). With Yronwode as editor-in-chief during a period of expanding attention to the art form, Eclipse published many innovative works and championed creators' rights in a field which at the time barely respected them.

During Yronwode's tenure, Eclipse published superhero titles including Miracleman by Alan Moore and Neil Gaiman, The Rocketeer by Dave Stevens, and Zot! by Scott McCloud. and also brought out graphic novels featuring opera adaptations, such as The Magic Flute by P. Craig Russell and  children's literature such as an adaptation of The Hobbit by J. R. R. Tolkien.

In 1985, Yronwode and cartoonist Trina Robbins co-wrote the Eclipse book Women and the Comics, on the history of female comic strip and comic book creators. As the first book on this subject, its publication was covered in the mainstream press in addition to the fan press.

Trading cards 
During the 1980s, Eclipse brought out a new line of non-fiction, non-sports trading cards, edited by Yronwode. Controversial political subjects such as the Iran-Contra scandal, the Savings and Loan crisis, the AIDS epidemic, and the Kennedy Assassination, as well as true crime accounts of serial killers, mass murderers, the Mafia, and organized crime were covered in these card sets.

1986 flood 
In February 1986, Eclipse lost most of its back-issue stock in a catastrophic Guerneville flood, which also submerged the company's offices.

Acme Press 
In 1988 Eclipse created a new division, Eclipse International, as it partnered with the British independent publisher Acme Press to distribute Acme's comics in the American market. (Eclipse had previously partnered with British publisher Dez Skinn's Quality Communications when it had published Miracleman [known as Marvelman in the UK].)  Highlights from the Acme/Eclipse era included Power Comics, a four-issue superhero title by writers Don Avenall and Norman Worker, with art by Dave Gibbons and Brian Bolland. The title was originally published in Nigeria in 1975, and the title's character's names was changed from "Powerman" to "Powerbolt" to avoid confusion with the character Luke Cage (also called "Power Man"), published by Marvel Comics. Another notable title from the Acme/Eclipse era was Aces, a five-issue black-and-white anthology of serialized Jazz Age genre stories which were originally published in Europe. Eclipse also distributed Acme's two-issue anthology Point Blank, which promoted itself as "The Best of European Strip Art".

In 1989 Acme acquired the comics license for James Bond. Acme and Eclipse co-published the official graphic novel adaptation of Licence to Kill, with art by Mike Grell, and then published Grell's three-issue series James Bond: Permission to Die — the first James Bond comic book storyline not adapted from a previous work — from 1989 to 1991. Eclipse also distributed Acme's three-issue licensed limited series Steed and Mrs. Peel in 1990–1992, by such notable creators as Grant Morrison and Ian Gibson.

In 1990 Acme teamed with Eclipse to release Eddie Campbell's The Complete Alec, which collected three previous "Alec" publications — Alec (1984), Love and Beerglasses (1985), and Doggie in the Window (1986) — together with some unpublished material. The collection won the 1991 UK Comic Art Award for Best Graphic Novel Collection.

Eclipse's arrangement with Acme lasted until 1991.

Viz Communications 
In 1988, in partnership with Viz Communications and Studio Proteus, Eclipse published some of the earliest English-translated Japanese manga, such as Area 88, Mai, the Psychic Girl, and The Legend of Kamui. With the success of these titles, the manga line was expanded.

Decline 
After-effects of the 1986 flood, Mullaney and Yronwode's 1993 divorce, and the mid-1990s evolution of the direct market distribution system caused the company to cease operations in 1994. and file for bankruptcy in 1995. The company's intellectual property rights were later acquired by Todd McFarlane for a total of $25,000. Mullaney also attributed the company's demise to a problematic contract with the book publisher HarperCollins. Eclipse's last publication was its Spring 1993 catalog, which was a complete bibliography of its publications.

Titles

See also
1977 in comics

References

External links
Eclipse (publisher) at the Grand Comics Database

 
1977 comics debuts
1977 establishments in New York City
1993 disestablishments in California
American companies established in 1977
Comic book publishing companies of the United States
Defunct comics and manga publishing companies
Publishing companies established in 1977
Publishing companies disestablished in 1993